Human metapneumovirus (HMPV) is a negative-sense single-stranded RNA virus of the family Pneumoviridae and is closely related to the Avian metapneumovirus (AMPV) subgroup C. It was isolated for the first time in 2001 in the Netherlands by using the RAP-PCR (RNA arbitrarily primed PCR) technique for identification of unknown viruses growing in cultured cells. It is the second most common cause after Respiratory syncytial virus (RSV) of lower respiratory infection in young children.

The peak age of hospitalization for infants with HMPV occurs between 6–12 months of age, slightly older than the peak of RSV, which is around 2–3 months. The clinical features and severity of HMPV are similar to those of RSV. HMPV is also an important cause of disease in older adults.

Taxonomy

Epidemiology
HMPV is associated with 5% to 40% of respiratory tract infections in hospitalized and outpatient children. The virus is distributed worldwide and, in temperate regions, has a seasonal distribution generally following that of RSV and influenza virus during late winter and spring. Serologic studies have shown that by the age of five, virtually all children worldwide have been exposed to the virus. Despite near universal infection during early life, reinfections are common in older children and adults. Human metapneumovirus may cause mild upper respiratory tract infection (the common cold). However, premature infants, immunocompromised persons, and older adults >65 years  are at risk for severe disease and hospitalization. In some studies of hospitalizations and emergency room visits, HMPV is nearly as common and as severe as influenza in older adults. HMPV is associated with more severe disease in people with asthma and adults with chronic obstructive pulmonary disease (COPD). Numerous outbreaks of HMPV have been reported in long-term care facilities for children and adults, causing fatalities.

Genome
The genomic organisation of HMPV is similar to RSV; however, HMPV lacks the non-structural genes, NS1 and NS2, and the HMPV antisense RNA genome contains eight open reading frames in slightly different gene order than RSV (viz. 3’-N-P-M-F-M2-SH-G-L-5’). HMPV is genetically similar to the avian metapneumoviruses A, B and in particular type C. Phylogenetic analysis of HMPV has demonstrated the existence of two main genetic lineages termed subtype A and B containing within them the subgroups A1/A2 and B1/B2 respectively. Genotyping based on sequences of the F and G genes showed that subtype B was associated with increased cough duration and increased general respiratory systems compared to HMPV-A.

Virology 
HMPV infects airway epithelial cells in the nose and lung. HMPV is thought to attach to the target cell via the glycoprotein (G) protein interactions with heparan sulfate and other glycosaminoglycans. The HMPV fusion (F) protein encodes an RGD (Arg-Gly-Asp) motif that engages RGD-binding integrins as cellular receptors, then mediates fusion of the cell membrane and viral envelope in a pH-independent fashion, likely within endosomes.

Detection 
The identification of HMPV has predominantly relied on reverse-transcriptase polymerase chain reaction (RT-PCR) technology to amplify directly from RNA extracted from respiratory specimens. Alternative more cost-effective approaches to the detection of HMPV by nucleic acid-based approaches have been employed and these include:
 detection of hMPV antigens in nasopharyngeal secretions by immunofluorescent-antibody test
 the use of immunofluorescence staining with monoclonal antibodies to detect HMPV in nasopharyngeal secretions and shell vial cultures
 immunofluorescence assays for detection of hMPV-specific antibodies
 the use of polyclonal antibodies and direct isolation in cultured cells.

Transmission
There are no conclusive studies to date; however, it is likely that transmission occurs by contact with contaminated secretions, via droplet, aerosol, or fomite vectors.  Hospital-acquired infections with human metapneumovirus have been reported. HMPV has been shown to circulate during fall and winter months with alternating predominance of a single subtype each year.

Treatment
No treatment is yet known, but ribavirin has shown effectiveness in an animal model.

American pharmaceutical corporation Moderna has conducted a clinical trial for a candidate modRNA vaccine against metapneumovirus. As of October 2019, the vaccine candidate has passed through phase I, with reports that the vaccine is well-tolerated at all dose levels at two months, and provokes an immune response which boosts the production of neutralising antibodies.

Evolution

Human metapneumovirus was first reported in 2001 and avian metapneumovirus in the 1970s. There are at least four lineages of human metapneumovirus—A1, A2, B1 and B2. Avian metapneumovirus has been divided into four subgroups—A, B, C and D. Bayesian estimates suggest that human metapneumovirus emerged 119–133 years ago and diverged from avian metapneumovirus around 1800.

References

External links
 ICTV Online (10th) Report Pneumoviridae
 hMPV EIA kit
 hMPV, Human Metapneumovirus
 Virus Pathogen Database and Analysis Resource (ViPR): Paramyxoviridae

Pneumoviridae